The Embassy of the United Republic of Tanzania in Washington, D.C. is the diplomatic mission of Tanzania in the United States. It is located at 1232 22nd Street NW in the West End neighborhood. The mission is also accredited to Mexico.

List of Ambassadors

The Tanzanian ambassador in Washington, D. C. is the official representative of the Government in Dodoma to the Government of the United States.

See also
 Diplomatic missions of Tanzania

References

External links
Official website

Tanzania
Washington, D.C.
Tanzania–United States relations
United States
Tanzania